Marsh Green is a small hamlet in Eden Vale, part of the parish of Edenbridge, England.  The hamlet was founded in 1554 under its current name.

Marsh Green claims the last bare-knuckle boxing fight in England, in 1886.

External links
Marsh Green

Edenbridge, Kent
Populated places established in 1554
Hamlets in Kent
1554 establishments in England